A Geosolar cycle is a repetitive interaction between earth and the sun. It may refer to:

 Solar activity and climate, variability in solar output
 Solar cycle, an 11-year cycle of sunspot and energy output
 Axial precession (Lunisolar precession), a 21,000 year cycle in the orientation of earth relative to the sun
 Precession of the ecliptic, a 41,000 year cycle in axial precession
 Milankovitch cycles, a roughly 100,000 year cycle in the Earth's climate